Edin Pepić (born 13 July 1991), previously known as Edin Sancaktar until 2019, is a German footballer who plays as a goalkeeper.

Personal life
Pepić was born in Ratingen, North Rhine-Westphalia to Yugoslav immigrants to Germany, originally with the surname Sancaktar. When moving to Germany, his father had to change his surname from Pepić to Sancaktar. In 2019, he re-took his father's original surname "Pepić".

References

External links

1991 births
Living people
People from Ratingen
Sportspeople from Düsseldorf (region)
Footballers from North Rhine-Westphalia
Association football goalkeepers
Fortuna Düsseldorf players
Borussia Dortmund II players
FC 08 Homburg players
Goslarer SC 08 players
SG Wattenscheid 09 players
Wuppertaler SV players
3. Liga players
German footballers